Akif Islamzade (born August 8, 1948) is a popular Azerbaijani singer.

Biography
Islamzade was born on 8 August 1948 in Baku to mugham singer Sara Gadimova. He graduated from Azerbaijan State Economic University in 1979. In 1972, he started as vocalist at Rashid Behbudov State Song Theatre. In 1976, he participated as vocalist in Tofig Ahmadov's state orchestra. In 1986, he stopped his musical activities due loss of voice. After that, he retired from recording full-length albums. The problem of his voice got worse, and affected not only his ability to sing, but also to speak.

References

20th-century Azerbaijani male singers
Musicians from Baku
Living people
1948 births
Azerbaijani pop singers